José Martín Recuerda (June 17, 1926 – June 8, 2007) was a Spanish dramatist and playwright.

Works 
   La garduña   (1940) unpublished.
   El padre Aníbal   (1941) unpublished.
   El enemigo   (1943)
   Dauro   (1944) unpublished.
   La reina soñada   (1945) unpublished.
   Caminos   (1945) iunpublished.
   La llanura   (1947)
   Los átridas   (1951) unpublished.
   El payaso y los pueblos del Sur   (1951) unpublished.
   Ella y los barcos   (1952) unpublished.
   Las ilusiones de las hermanas viajeras   (1955)
   El teatrito de don Ramón   (1957)
   Como las secas cañas del camino   (1960)
   Las salvajes en Puente San Gil   (1961) 
   El Cristo   (1964)
   ¿Quién quiere una copla del Arcipreste de Hita?   (1965)
   El caraqueño   (1968)
   Las arrecogías del beaterio de Santa María Egipciaca   (1970)
   El engañao   (1972)
   Caballos desbocaos   (1978)
   Las conversiones   (1980)
   Carteles rotos   (1983)
   La Troski   (1984)
   Amadís de Gaula   (1986)
   La Troski se va a las Indias   (1987)
   La deuda   (1988)
   Las reinas del Paralelo   (1991)
   La "Caramba" en la iglesia de San Jerónimo el Real   (1993)
   El enamorado   (1994). unpublished.
   Los últimos días del escultor de su alma   (1995) unpublished.

References
Remember Martin, Joseph (1978). The wild in San Gil Puente and the beguinage arrecogías of St. Mary of Egypt (Ramon Ruiz Francisco edition). Editions Chair.
Sanz Villanueva, Santos (2008). History of Spanish Literature 6/2. Current Literature (6th edition). Editorial Ariel.

Spanish male dramatists and playwrights
Spanish academics
1926 births
2007 deaths
20th-century Spanish dramatists and playwrights
20th-century Spanish male writers